Linakeng is a community council located in the Thaba Tseka District of Lesotho.

Villages
The community of Linakeng includes the villages of Ha Firi, Matebeng, Sehonghong, Mashai (Moreneng), Hloahloeng (Ha Teke), Taung, Khotsong, Ha Rampeoane, Phahameng, Ha Motjolopane, Ha Theko, Pontseng, Ha Mankereu, Kolebere, Ha Khanyetsi, Ha Setala, Khochaneng, Ha Seroala-Nkhoana, Linakeng, Ha Makunyapane, Ha Shoaepane, Taung, Ha Khoali, Ha Khatho, Matlatseng, Lekhalong, Ha Makoko, Pitseng, Makhanyaneng, Bokhoase, Thaba-Bosiu, Ha Korotla, Lulang, Ha Mapheelle, Tiping, Ha Chakatsa, Moriting,

References

External links
 Google map of community villages

Populated places in Butha-Buthe District